Snyder High School is a public high school located in the city of Snyder, Texas, United States and classified as a 4A school by the University Interscholastic League (UIL). It is a part of the Snyder Independent School District located in central Scurry County. In 2015, the school was rated "Met Standard" by the Texas Education Agency.

Athletics
The Snyder Tigers compete in these sports - 

Volleyball, Cross Country, Football, Basketball, Powerlifting, Golf, Tennis, Track, Baseball, Softball & Soccer

State Titles
Baseball - 
1983(4A), 2008(3A)
Boys Golf - 
1986(4A), 1997(4A), 2003(3A), 2005(3A), 2006(3A)
Girls Golf - 
1986(4A), 1997(4A), 2003(3A), 2005(3A), 2006(3A)
Volleyball - 
1972(3A), 1978(4A), 1980(4A), 1981(4A), 1985(4A)

State Finalist
Baseball - 
1960(3A)
Boys Basketball - 
1980(3A)

Theater
One Act Play 
1968(3A), 1970(3A), 1971(3A), 1972(3A), 1976(3A), 1977(3A), 1979(3), 1982(4A), 1984(4A), 1985(4A), 1988(4A), 1993(4A), 1995(4A)

Notable alumni

Patrick Malone, actor
Perry Robertson, audio engineer
Calvin Wimmer, actor
Dane Witherspoon, actor
Powers Boothe, actor
Sonny Cumbie, football coach
Hayward Clay, former NFL player
Tony Degrate, former NFL player
Jack Spikes, former NFL player

References

External links
Snyder High School website

Public high schools in Texas
Schools in Scurry County, Texas